Gemmula webberae is a species of sea snail, a marine gastropod mollusk in the family Turridae, the turrids.

Description
The length of the shell attains 55 mm.

Distribution
This marine species occurs off South Africa;off Madagascar and Zanzibar.

References

 Kilburn R.N. (1975). Taxonomic notes on South African marine Mollusca (5): including descriptions of new taxa of Rissoidae, Cerithiidae, Tonnidae, Cassididae, Buccinidae, Fasciolariidae, Turbinellidae, Turridae, Architectonicidae, Epitoniidae, Limidae and Thraciidae. Annals of the Natal Museum 22(2):577-622, figs. 1-25
 Steyn, D.G & Lussi, M. (2005). Offshore Shells of Southern Africa: A pictorial guide to more than 750 Gastropods. Published by the authors. Pp. i–vi, 1–289.
 Kilburn, R.N. (1983) Turridae (Mollusca: Gastropoda) of southern Africa and Mozambique. Part 1. Subfamily Turrinae. Annals of the Natal Museum, 25, 549–585

webberae
Gastropods described in 1975